Cacia cretifera is a species of beetle in the family Cerambycidae. It was described by Frederick William Hope in 1831. It is known from Java, Cambodia, India, Myanmar, China, Nepal, Thailand, Laos, and Vietnam. It feeds on Berberis thunbergii and Albizia julibrissin.

Subspecies
 Cacia cretifera cretifera (Hope, 1831)
 Cacia cretifera griseostictica Breuning, 1939
 Cacia cretifera javanica Breuning, 1963
 Cacia cretifera thibetana (Pic, 1917)

References

Cacia (beetle)
Beetles described in 1831